Edward D. Banta is a United States Marine Corps lieutenant general who serves as the Deputy Commandant for Installations and Logistics since July 9, 2021. He most recently served as the commander of the Marine Corps Installations Command. In April 2021, he was nominated for promotion to lieutenant general and assignment as Deputy Commandant for Installations and Logistics, replacing LtGen Charles Chiarotti.

References

External links

Year of birth missing (living people)
Living people
Place of birth missing (living people)
United States Marine Corps generals